In number theory, Euler's theorem (also known as the Fermat–Euler theorem or Euler's totient theorem) states that, if  and  are coprime positive integers, and  is Euler's totient function, then  raised to the power  is congruent to  modulo ; that is

In 1736, Leonhard Euler published a proof of Fermat's little theorem (stated by Fermat without proof), which is the restriction of Euler's theorem to the case where  is a prime number.  Subsequently, Euler presented other proofs of the theorem, culminating with his paper of 1763, in which he proved a generalization to the case where  is not prime.

The converse of Euler's theorem is also true: if the above congruence is true, then  and  must be coprime.

The theorem  is further generalized by Carmichael's theorem.

The theorem may be used to easily reduce large powers modulo . So Euler's theorem yields , and we get .

if , then .

Euler's theorem underlies the RSA cryptosystem, which is widely used in Internet communications. In this cryptosystem, Euler's theorem is used with  being a product of two large prime numbers, and the security of the system is based on the difficulty of factoring such an integer.

Proofs 
1. Euler's theorem can be proven using concepts from the theory of groups: 
The residue classes modulo  that are coprime to  form a group under multiplication (see the article Multiplicative group of integers modulo n for details). Lagrange's theorem states that the order of any subgroup of a finite group divides the order of the entire group, in this case . Lagrange's theorem says  must divide , i.e. there is an integer  such that . This then implies,

2. The proof hinges on the fundamental fact that multiplication by  permutes the : in other words if  then . (This law of cancellation is proved in the article Multiplicative group of integers modulo n.)
 and using the cancellation law to cancel each  gives Euler's theorem:

See also
 Carmichael function
 Euler's criterion
 Fermat's little theorem
 Wilson's theorem

Notes

References
The Disquisitiones Arithmeticae has been translated from Gauss's Ciceronian Latin into English and German. The German edition includes all of his papers on number theory: all the proofs of quadratic reciprocity, the determination of the sign of the Gauss sum, the investigations into biquadratic reciprocity, and unpublished notes.

External links 
 
 Euler-Fermat Theorem at PlanetMath

Modular arithmetic
Theorems in number theory
Articles containing proofs
Leonhard Euler